Ruthless is the second studio album by American rapper Ace Hood. It was released on June 30, 2009, by We the Best Music Group, Dollaz N Dealz Entertainment and Def Jam Recordings. The album debuted at number 23 on the US Billboard 200, selling 19,700 copies in its first week.

Singles
The album's first single, "Overtime" featuring T-Pain and Akon, was released on May 19, 2009. The production on the song was handled by The Runners, while it was co-produced by Kevin Cossom.

The album's second single, "Champion" featuring Jazmine Sullivan and Rick Ross, was released on June 16, 2009. The production team The Runners, would once again produced this song, this time with the production handled by Carvin & Ivan.

Track listing

Charts

References

2009 albums
Def Jam Recordings albums
Ace Hood albums
Albums produced by the Runners
Albums produced by Tricky Stewart
Albums produced by The-Dream
Albums produced by the Inkredibles
Albums produced by Cardiak